Jane Abeiyuwa Igharo is a Nigerian fiction writer of contemporary romance novels. She is best known for her debut novel Ties That Tether.

Early life 
Jane Igharo was born in Nigeria to parents from Edo State and spent most of her childhood in the country before she immigrated alongside her family to Canada at the age of twelve. She pursued her education and earned a Journalism degree from the University of Toronto after which she worked as a communications specialist in Ontario, Canada.

Growing up as the child of immigrants, Igharo stated that her family had great expectations for her and she was told by her mother that she could not date or marry outside her ethnicity in a bid to ensure that continuity of their culture in a western setting. This eventually gave her the idea and concept of her debut novel.

Career 
Igharo's debut novel, Ties That Tether inspired by her personal life and Immigrant experiences was published by Berkley on September 29, 2020, and received mainly positive feedback from critics and readers. Her second novel, The Sweetest Remedy was published in September 2021 and is an Amazon, it received positive reviews.

Where We End & Begin, Igharo's third novel was published in 2022 and is also an Amazon Editors pick.

Bibliography 

 Ties That Tether - Berkley (September 29, 2020)
 The Sweetest Remedy - Berkley (September 28, 2021)
 Where We End & Begin - Berkley (September 27, 2022)
 Sisi Americanah (forthcoming, 2023)

References 

Living people
Nigerian women novelists
Canadian women novelists

Writers from Ontario
Novelists from Texas
University of Toronto alumni
21st-century Nigerian novelists
21st-century Canadian novelists
21st-century Nigerian women writers
21st-century Canadian women writers
Women writers of young adult literature
Women romantic fiction writers
Year of birth missing (living people)